Metre-gauge railways are narrow-gauge railways with track gauge of  or 1 metre.

It was used by European colonial powers, such as the French, British and German Empires in their colonies. In Europe, large metre-gauge networks remain in use in Switzerland, Spain and many European towns with urban trams, but most metre-gauge local railways in France, Germany and Belgium closed down in the mid-20th century, although many still remain. With the revival of urban rail transport, metre-gauge light metros were established in some cities, and in other cities, metre gauge was replaced by standard gauge. The slightly-wider  gauge is used in Sofia.

Examples of metre-gauge

See also 
 Italian metre gauge
 Narrow-gauge railways

References

External links
Railroad Gauge Width

Track gauges by name
 
Metre gauge railways by country